Playin' Possum is the 1982 debut solo album by Moe Tucker, who was the drummer in the Velvet Underground. The album includes a number of renditions of classic rock and roll songs, (such as the 1955 standard "Louie Louie", Bo Diddley's title song from his 1958 self-titled album and the Little Richard hit "Slippin' and Slidin'"), as well as renditions of more modern rock songs (including Bob Dylan's "I'll Be Your Baby Tonight" and The Velvet Underground's own "Heroin"). Tucker performs every instrument on the album and recorded it in her living room, dubbed "Trash Records". "Ellas" was dedicated to Bo Diddley.

Track listing 
Side 1
"Bo Diddley" (Ellas McDaniel) – 3:56
"Heroin" (Lou Reed) – 8:49
"Slippin' and Slidin'" (Richard Penniman, Edwin Bocage, Al Collins, James Smith) – 3:18
"I'll Be Your Baby Tonight" (Bob Dylan) – 3:18

Side 2
"Louie Louie" (Richard Berry) – 2:42
"Slippin' and Slidin'" (Penniman, Bocage, Collins, Smith) – 4:30
"Concerto in D Major" (Antonio Vivaldi) – 3:47
"Around and Around" (Chuck Berry) – 3:42
"Ellas" (Moe Tucker) – 6:01

Personnel
Moe Tucker – vocals, drums, lead guitar, rhythm guitar, alto saxophone, synthesizer, tambourine, claves, harmonica, bass, gato drums, arrangements
Technical
Stephen Mikulka - recording engineer, front cover artwork and photography

Release history
Trash TLP 1001 (Original vinyl LP release)
M.T.-1441 (white jacket German reissue)

References

1982 debut albums
Maureen Tucker albums
Rough Trade Records albums
Albums produced by Maureen Tucker